Verkhny Chiamakhi (Dargwa: ЧебяхI ЧIигIямахьи) is a rural locality (a selo) in Kassagumakhinsky Selsoviet, Akushinsky District, Republic of Dagestan, Russia. The population was 78 as of 2010.

Geography 
Verkhny Chiamakhi is located 41 km south of Akusha (the district's administrative centre) by road, on the Karakotta River. Nizhny Chiamakhi is the nearest rural locality.

References 

Rural localities in Akushinsky District